Joseph Martin (14 October 1802; Nîmes – 1873) commonly known as Joseph Martin-Paschoud, was a French liberal Protestant pastor. He served as a pastor in Luneray and Lyon, before serving as a pastor in Paris from 1837 until his death.

In January 1866, the 's presbyteral council attempted to force Martin-Paschoud into retirement, but they were unsuccessful when the presiding minister refused to authorise the action.

Martin-Paschoud crossed religious lines throughout his career, attending the investiture ceremony of Zadoc Kahn as Chief Rabbi of Paris. He gave his support to the peace society founded by Catholic economist Frédéric Passy in 1867.

References

1802 births
1873 deaths
French Protestants
People from Nîmes